There are over 9,000 Grade I listed buildings in England.  This page is a list of these buildings in the district of Gloucester in Gloucestershire.

Gloucester

|}

Notes

References 
English Heritage Images of England

External links

Gloucester
Gloucester